Bulgaria–Slovakia relations are foreign relations between Bulgaria and Slovakia. Bulgaria originally established diplomatic ties with Czechoslovakia in 1920. Slovakia declared independence from Czechoslovakia in 1993, and was briefly independent during World War II as the Slovak Republic (1939-1945). Bulgaria and Slovakia established diplomatic relations for the first time between 1939 and 1945. Both countries re-established diplomatic relations on January 1, 1993. Since February 1994, Bulgaria has an embassy in Bratislava. Since June 1994, Slovakia has an embassy in Sofia.

See also 
 Foreign relations of Bulgaria
 Foreign relations of Slovakia

External links 
  Bulgarian embassy in Bratislava
  Slovakia has an embassy in Sofia

 

 
Slovakia
Bilateral relations of Slovakia